C-Dogs, the sequel to Cyberdogs, is a shoot 'em up video game where players work cooperatively during missions, and against each other in "dogfight" deathmatch mode.

Gameplay
C-Dogs made changes and improvements on the original Cyberdogs game mechanics. The single-player/cooperative gameplay is separated into campaigns, each comprising many missions. Usually, each level involves the player(s) killing enemies (while avoiding harming civilians and teammates) using a variety of pre-selected weapons; collecting keys to unlock special rooms; and picking up required items to fulfill the mission objectives.

The "dog fight" gameplay is the typical deathmatch: players attempt to kill each other for points, in order to gain victory. Only two players can play against each other, by sitting at the same computer and using the keyboard, joysticks or gamepads.

Development
The creator of C-Dogs, Ronny Wester, released the precursor to C-Dogs, Cyberdogs, in 1994. The popularity of Cyberdogs and the limitations of its 16-bit protected mode motivated Wester to write a sequel, which was released between the years 1997 to 2001 as Freeware. In 2000 Wester released the Borland Pascal 7 source code of Cyberdogs (minus some libraries he had licensed) on his website.

Open source
In 2002 Wester released the source code of C-Dogs to the public. Following that Jeremy Chin and Lucas Martin-King ported the game to SDL and released their work under the GNU GPL-2.0-or-later as "C-Dogs SDL". As of June 2007, Wester no longer maintains a website for C-Dogs but the game continues to live on via the C-Dogs SDL project hosted on GitHub. The open source software port contains a number of enhancements to the original C-Dogs, including high-resolution support, local multiplayer up to four players, enhanced graphics and LAN multiplayer. In October 2015, C-Dogs SDL was updated to SDL2. In April 2016, Wester released the game assets as CC-BY.

Ports 
With the source code availability and the initial SDL port, the game was ported later for many platforms: Android, GCW Zero, GP2X, Dingoo, PlayStation Portable, Dreamcast, Nintendo DS, Wii, Amiga OS, UIQ3 devices such as SE M600, P1i, P990, and Motorola RIZR Z8.

Reception 
Hardcore Gaming 101 reviewed C-Dogs in May 2017.

See also
 List of open source games

References

External links 
 Ronny Wester's official site for C-Dogs (archived in 2005 on Web Archive)
 C-Dogs SDL - Initial port of C-Dogs to SDL
 C-Dogs SDL fork - Continued fork of C-Dogs SDL

1997 video games
Cooperative video games
DOS games
Linux games
MacOS games
Open-source video games
Shooter video games
Freeware games
Windows games
BeOS games
Formerly proprietary software
Free software that uses SDL
Multiplayer and single-player video games
Video games developed in Sweden
Creative Commons-licensed video games
Public-domain software with source code